Níki (before 1926: Νεγκοτσάνη - Negkotsani; Macedonian and , Negočani or Negochani) is a village situated in the Florina regional unit, Greece, along the border with North Macedonia. The village is located 14 km north of Florina at the Medžitlija-Níki border crossing. Its name in Greek means victory. The main road through Niki connects the border crossing with the city of Kozani and forms a part of the E65 route.

The village was first mentioned in an Ottoman defter of 1468, where it is listed under the name of Negočani and described as having 203 households. In 1481, the number had declined to 112 households. The village produced vines, flax, hemp, honey, and swine; and possessed mills and a market.

The Greek census (1920) recorded 562 people in the village and in 1923 there were 86 inhabitants (or 16 families) who were Muslim. Following the Greek-Turkish population exchange, in 1926 within Negkotsani there were 18 refugee families from Pontus. The Greek census (1928) recorded 662 village inhabitants. In 1928, there were 18 refugee families (77 people). 

The population of the village in 2011 was 273.

Notes

Populated places in Florina (regional unit)